ABC plan (also known as the Nimetz initiative) was a proposed settlement of the Cyprus dispute, presented by the USA but co-authored by Britain and Canada as well, hence the abbreviation ABC (American-British-Canadian). The settlement was proposed in 1979. It projected a loose federation between the Greek and Turkish community of Cyprus and it was based on previous agreements between Greek and Turkish Cypriot leaders, and UN resolutions. It was rejected by all sides.

The plan 

The plan consisted of twelve points, according to Eleftherios Michael most important were:
The creation of a Bicommunal Bizonal Federation,
Bicameral legislature,
Withdrawal of all foreign troops, 
Turkish Cypriots to give back to Greek Cypriots substantial amount of land.

The central federal government would be in charge of Foreign Affairs, Defence, finance and economy, ports, customs controls and immigration.

Reception and aftermath 

Newly elected Greek Cypriot president Spyros Kyprianou was fast to reject the plan, Turkey followed. Even so, the Nimetz initiative was utilized by other UN general secretaries as a base to new plans.

See also 
Annan Plan

References

Sources
 
 

Cyprus peace process
Political history of Cyprus
1970s in Cyprus